Paul Soter (born August 16, 1969) is an American actor, writer, and director, and one of the members of the Broken Lizard comedy group. As a child, he lived in Sacramento, Anchorage, Phoenix, and Denver. He graduated from Colgate University and was a member of the Beta Theta Pi fraternity. During his time there, he was a member of the Charred Goosebeak troupe along with the members of Broken Lizard.

Filmography

Film/Television

Writer/Director/Producer

External links
 

1979 births
American male comedians
21st-century American comedians
Broken Lizard
Colgate University alumni
Living people